USS Woonsocket (PF-32) was a  in service with the United States Navy from 1944 to 1946. She was sold to Peru in 1947, where she served as BAP Gálvez (F-1/FE-1) until 1961.

Construction
USS Woonsocket (PF-32) was named for Woonsocket, Rhode Island. She was originally classified as PG-140 and re-designated PF-32 on 25 June 1943, was laid down under a Maritime Commission contract (MC hull 1443) on 12 August 1943 at the Walter Butler Shipbuilding Company in Superior, Wisconsin; launched on 27 September 1943, sponsored by Mrs. Ernest E. Dupre, wife of the mayor of Woonsocket; ferried to the Boston Navy Yard for completion; accepted by the Navy on 27 July 1944; and commissioned with a Coast Guard crew on 1 September 1944.

Service history
Following shakedown off Bermuda, Woonsocket returned to Boston for conversion to a weather ship before proceeding to Newfoundland, arriving at NS Argentia on 30 October.  She performed meteorological charting duties off Newfoundland through the end of World War II and into the early months of 1946. She was decommissioned by the Navy on 16 March 1946 and recommissioned simultaneously by the Coast Guard on a loan basis.  Woonsocket served with the Coast Guard until her final decommissioning on 18 September 1946 at New Orleans, Louisiana

Peruvian service

Struck from the Navy list on 14 May 1947, the frigate was subsequently transferred to the Government of Peru. She served the Peruvian Navy first as Teniente Gálvez (F 1) and later simply as Gálvez. Reclassified FE-1, she was decommissioned in 1961, and later broken up.

References

External links

Tacoma-class frigates
World War II patrol vessels of the United States
Ships built in Superior, Wisconsin
Ships transferred from the United States Navy to the United States Coast Guard
Ships transferred from the United States Navy to the Peruvian Navy
1943 ships
Weather ships